Listowel  is an unincorporated community in Ontario, Canada, located in the Municipality of North Perth. Incorporated as the Town of Listowel in 1875, it was dissolved in 1998 following amalgamation with several other communities in the northern section of Perth County. Its population was 9,539 at the Canada 2021 Census in a land area of 6.73 square kilometres; at the time there were 3,910 occupied dwellings.

History

Economic expansion
In 1871 the Wellington, Grey and Bruce Railway extended its line to Listowel. It was joined in 1873 by a second railway, the Stratford and Huron Railway, and Listowel soon became an important shipping point.  The arrival of the railway hastened development and Listowel became a Town with a population of 2,054 in 1875 in what is now North Perth in Perth County, Ontario.

In 1877, the first elementary school opened.

Electricity came to Listowel in 1897, and in 1900 the Listowel Furniture Company opened. By 1902 the population had increased to 2,661, and a woolen mill, a planing mill, a flour mill, a brewery and a dairy products exporting company were operating in the town.

1950s - present
On February 28, 1959, the roof of the Listowel Memorial Arena collapsed under heavy snow, burying a boys' hockey team playing a scrimmage game. Seven players, along with a referee and recreation director, were killed in the collapse in what was described by the Waterloo Region Record as "Listowel's darkest day". The arena was rebuilt and closed in 2017 following the construction of the Steve Kerr Memorial Complex. The arena was demolished on February 2, 2021.

On March 17, 2011, the local dollar store caught fire and its roof collapsed, killing volunteer firefighters Ray Walter (30) and Ken Rea (56). Listowel mourned the loss, closing major streets and posting black ribbons all over town in honour of the fallen firefighters. Paddyfest festivities continued to honour Kinsman Ray Walter, but in a somber fashion.

Between the 2016 and 2021 Censuses, Listowel's population grew by 26.7 percent, helping drive North Perth's population growth to 18.3 percent.

Education
Public education in Listowel is administered by the Avon Maitland District School Board, who manage Listowel District Secondary School and elementary schools Listowel Eastdale Public School and North Perth Westfield Elementary School. North Perth Westfield Elementary School, an amalgamation of Wallace Public School and Listowel Central School, accepted its first cohort of students in September 2016.

Culture
The Bookery (now the Salvation Army Thrift Store) is located across from Veky's International Cuisine Restaurant. This Celtic-inspired book store stocks about 25,000 books and traditional Celtic, Irish and Scottish jewellery in silver. In addition, they provide gallery space for local artists to display their work. Listowel has also raised musicians from many genres, such as Thirteen O'Clock,<ref>{{cite web|url=http://www.supernova.com/ThirteenOclock |title=Thirteen OClock |publisher=Supernova.com |date=November 2, 2011 |access-date=November 29, 2011}}</ref> and Brian Vollmer (lead singer of Helix).

Paddyfest
The official spokesperson for Paddyfest is chosen yearly in the Paddyfest Ambassador Competition. Contestants must perform a speech, impromptu question and interview with the judges and receive the overall highest score to be awarded this position. A separate award of Talent is given out to the contestant with the highest score in the talent competition. Runner-up and Congeniality are also awards which are available. The Paddyfest Ambassador Competition changed its name and official status from being Miss Paddyfest when first created.

Events at the Fest include arm wrestling and a parade.

Sports

Listowel has a Jr. "B" hockey team from the Greater Ontario Junior Hockey League (Mid-West Conference). They are called the Listowel Cyclones. The town also hosts a baseball team, the Listowel Jr. Legionnaires. Part II Bistro Ladies Classic, a curling bonspiel takes place in Listowel Curling Club.

Economy
The Campbell Soup Company was a major local employer for 48 years, operating a frozen, foodservice and specialty food plant in Listowel. This relationship ended abruptly with the announcement of the factory's pending closure on April 28, 2008. In 2010 the former Campbell Soup plant was purchased by Erie Meat Products and expected to ship 50-60 million pounds of poultry to world markets on an annual basis.

Since 1996 the area around Listowel has attracted new industries.

Notable people

 Corey Conners, PGA pro golfer
 Jared Keeso, Gemini Award-winning actor
 John G. Smale, President, CEO and Chairman of Procter & Gamble; Chairman of General Motors
 Calvin Bricker, Track and field athlete
 Cyclone Taylor, ice hockey player and Hall of Famer
George Hay, NHL ice hockey player and World War I veteran
 Ann Voskamp, author, winner of the Award of Merit in Christianity Today''s Books of the Year, 2012 
 Paul McIntosh, ice hockey player
 Roland McKeown, ice hockey player
 Walter Knox, Track and field athlete

See also

 Listowel, County Kerry, Ireland
 List of population centres in Ontario

References

Further reading

External links

Former towns in Ontario
Communities in Perth County, Ontario